The Beech Creek Formation is a geologic formation in Indiana. It preserves fossils dating back to the Carboniferous period.

See also

 List of fossiliferous stratigraphic units in Indiana

References
 

Carboniferous Indiana
Carboniferous southern paleotropical deposits